"Heimat, deine Sterne" (Homeland, Your Stars) is a German song written by Erich Knauf and Werner Bochmann for the comedy film Quax the Crash Pilot (Quax, der Bruchpilot) in 1941.

External links
Heimat deine Sterne

1941 songs
German songs
German patriotic songs